Neil Wiley  is an American intelligence official and military veteran who served as Principal Executive in the Office of the Director of National Intelligence (DNI) performing the duties of Principal Deputy Director of National Intelligence from May 13, 2020 until February 2021.

Early life and education
Born and raised in Baltimore, Maryland, Wiley attended the University of Maryland Baltimore County, where he studied Biological Sciences, Ancient History and Classical Languages. Wiley is married to Alison Michelli, a writer, and has 1 child.

Career
Wiley has held a large number of leadership positions in a wide variety of intelligence roles.  In additional to Principal Executive at ODNI, he also served as the Chairman of the National Intelligence Council (NIC), and as Director for Analysis at the Defense Intelligence Agency (DIA), where he led their all-source analytic effort. Additionally, Wiley served the country in many different capacities prior to that:

 As the DIA Principal Deputy Director for Analysis
 DIA Chief of the Defense Technology and Long-Range Analysis Office
 DIA Chief, of the Military Forces Analysis Office.

On top of the above, Wiley has been critical in international intelligence efforts, having served at the United States European Command's Joint Analysis Center in various roles including Deputy Director of Intelligence. Wiley served in the United States Navy from 1983 through 2003, initially as a Surface Line Officer and, later, as an Intelligence Officer.

Awards and honors
 The Presidential Rank Award-Meritorious Senior Executive
 National Intelligence Distinguished Service Medal
 National Intelligence Superior Service Medal
 The DIA Director's Award
 The DIA Exceptional Civilian Service Medal
 Named an honorary officer of the Most Excellent Order of the British Empire (OBE) for service as US Liaison Officer to PJHQ and recognized as instrumental in US Britain relations.

References

University System of Maryland alumni
Living people
Trump administration personnel
United States Deputy Directors of National Intelligence
Year of birth missing (living people)